Sex Traffic is a two-part British-Canadian television thriller, written by Abi Morgan and directed by David Yates, that first broadcast on Channel 4 on 14 October 2004. The series, produced by Veronica Castillo and Derek Wax, stars John Simm as Daniel Appleton, a journalist who uncovers a trafficking ring involving Anti-Trafficking officers employed by a private security company in the United States. As Daniel vows to help Elena (Anamaria Marinca), one of the trafficked girls,  he attempts to expose the business which forces young women from Eastern Europe into a life of sexual slavery.

The series was filmed between London, Bucharest and Nova Scotia. The series was also broadcast on CBC in Canada during October 2004. Marinca, in her first credited television role, won the BAFTA award for Best Actress, one of eight BAFTAs, including Best Drama Serial, and four Gemini Awards for the series. The series was released on DVD on September 4, 2006.

Plot
The expulsion of Sergeant Callum Tate, an Anti-Trafficking officer working in Bosnia, sparks concern for multi-national private security company Kernwell, headed up by Tom Harlsburgh. Having been caught seemingly trying to procure a prostitute for $2,000, Tate's actions have threatened to throw the entire company into disrepute, just as the directors are on the brink of signing an $8 million contract to provide private security in Iraq. Tate denies the allegations, claiming that he was trying to free Anya Petria, a student who had been trafficked from Romania and forced to work as a prostitute. Tate claims that a number of Kernwell officers, including Major James Brooke, are involved in a trafficking ring involving the enslavement of young women seeking refuge from their own countries in the hope of finding a better life in the West. Kernwell order a press blackout, preventing Tate's suspension or any of the allegations made reaching the press.

Meanwhile, Daniel Appleton, a journalist working for London-based charity Speak For Freedom, travels to Bosnia to report on Kernwell's activities, and whilst there, he witnesses a number of Anti-Trafficking officers having sex with prostitutes at a local bar. Before he can report his findings, the bar is raided and information is spread to suggest that he was caught having sex with a prostitute, Elena Visinescu, at the time of the raid. Appleton refutes the allegations, but is ordered to cease investigation into Kernwell by his boss, Joan Stewart. Appleton decides to continue privately investigating Kernwell, and discovers that shortly after leaving Bosnia, Anya's body was found washed up on the shores of an Italian beach. After becoming separated from her sister, Elena heads for London to find Appleton. With Elena's help, Appleton sets out to expose the corrupt officers working for the Anti-Trafficking unit and bring Kernwell to book.

Cast
 John Simm as Daniel Appleton
 Anamaria Marinca as Elena Visinescu
 Maria Popistașu as Vara Visinescu
 Chris Potter as Tom Harlsburgh
 Wendy Crewson as Madeleine Harlsburgh
 Len Cariou as Magnus Herzoff
 Maury Chaykin as Ernie Dwight
 Luke Kirby as Sergeant Callum Tate
 Robert Joy as Major James Brooke
 Alison Peebles as Joan Stewart
 Dan Astileanu as Deputy Chief Rudi Lascar
 Razvan Vasilescu as Colonel Matteo Giusto 
 Jason Watkins as Inspector Lucas Reese
 John Sharian as Barry Edwards
 Rodica Negrea as Luiba Visinescu 
 Carlotta Natoli as Dr. Lola Carizonne
 Barbara Eve Harris as Audrey Dupoint
 Alexandra Fasola as Anya Petria
 Ephraim Ellis as Billy Harlsburgh
 Nikki Barnett as Leah Harlsburgh
 Arben Bajraktaraj as Thaki
 Emil Hostina as Severin
 Elina Löwensohn as Maria Danielski 
 Zoltan Butuc as Petre Danielski

Reception
Sex Traffic received critical acclaim across the board, with the British Film Institute's Screenonline writing; "As in his previous television work, including his adaptation of Anthony Trollope's The Way We Live Now which drew parallels between its ruthless Victorian entrepreneur hero and modern media tycoons, and the fine conspiracy thriller, State of Play, director David Yates gives a thrilling and complicated narrative a strong social and political dimension. The brutality of brothel life is tellingly juxtaposed with the ethics of Boston business, which is lavish with its charity while turning a knowingly blind eye to corruption. Sex Traffic is impeccably photographed, edited and scored."

The Daily Telegraph wrote, "Sex Traffic is brutally honest in its treatment of a distressing subject, but it's this very honesty that makes it such a vital drama. It does indeed go to the heart of the audience, and its dark images stay with you for a long, long time. Difficult viewing, yes, but essential." Empire commented that Sex Traffic was a "courageous, shocking piece of work", while The Guardian called it "a gripping thriller". John Simm commented, "Watching Sex Traffic is not a horrible experience, because it works well as a thriller, so it's exciting and you are always gunning for the good guys – but you can't escape the fact that it's a depressing subject matter."

See also
Human trafficking
Human Trafficking (miniseries)

References

External links
 
 

2000s Canadian television miniseries
2000s Canadian drama television series
2004 Canadian television series debuts
2004 Canadian television series endings
Channel 4 original programming
2000s British television miniseries
2000s British drama television series
2004 British television series debuts
2004 British television series endings
Television series by ITV Studios
Television shows produced by Granada Television
English-language television shows
Films directed by David Yates
Works about sex trafficking
Prostitution in British television
Gemini and Canadian Screen Award for Best Television Film or Miniseries winners
English-language Canadian films